The 1954 NBA All Star Game was the fourth NBA All-Star Game.  It was held on January 21, 1954, at Madison Square Garden in New York City. Bob Cousy of the Boston Celtics was the game MVP.  Joe Lapchick of the New York Knicks coached the Eastern Conference and John Kundla of the Minneapolis Lakers coached the Western Conference. The attendance was 16,487.

The Eastern Conference held an 84–82 edge with only seconds remaining in the game. Then, George Mikan of the Lakers was fouled. Mikan proceeded to make both foul shots, which sent the game into overtime.

In the extra period, Cousy scored 10 points to secure a 98–93 victory. The Western Conference's Jim Pollard, the game's high scorer with 23 points, had been named MVP in a vote taken before regulation time had run out. But another ballot was taken and Cousy became the MVP.

The 1954 All-Star Game, despite going into overtime,  was the last All-Star Game in which neither side reached 100 points.

Roster

Eastern Conference
Head Coach: Joe Lapchick, New York Knicks

Western Conference
Head Coach: John Kundla, Minneapolis Lakers

Notes

References
General

Specific

External links
NBA All-Star Game History
NBA.com: All-Star Game: Year-by-Year Results

National Basketball Association All-Star Game
All-Star Game
Sports in Manhattan
Basketball in New York City
NBA All-Star Game
Sports competitions in New York City
NBA All-Star Game
1950s in Manhattan
Madison Square Garden